Anna Michelle McGurk (née Potts; 23 August 1968 – 28 August 1991) was an English council worker from Gloucester,  Gloucestershire. She was raped and murdered in Gloucester by Andrew Hagans, who was on bail and living at the nearby Ryecroft bail hostel. Hagans had been arrested for the rape of a 20-year-old woman just 24 days before Anna's death. He had a long history of violent crime, and had been imprisoned for burglary. Hagans was sentenced to life imprisonment for Anna's murder, with a concurrent 10-year sentence for the rape.

Following a campaign by Kay Potts, Anna McGurk's mother, the crime led to changes in English law. Michael Stephen, then MP for Shoreham, moved the Bail (Amendment) Bill, which became the Bail (Amendment) Act 1993. The police and Crown Prosecution Service can now challenge a decision by magistrates to grant bail to an alleged offender.

The Anna McGurk Trust, founded in her memory, awards bursaries to pupils of St Peter's High School, where McGurk had been a pupil. There is a small memorial stone in Gloucester.

References

Rape in England
1990s in Gloucestershire
1991 murders in the United Kingdom
1991 in England
Murder in Gloucestershire
History of Gloucester
Incidents of violence against women
1968 births
1991 deaths
Violence against women in England